The 1988 Fosters Professional was a non-ranking invitational snooker tournament, which took place between 3 and 5 October 1988. The tournament featured four professional players and was filmed in RTÉ Studios, Dublin, for broadcast on RTÉ.

Mike Hallett won the tournament defeating Stephen Hendry 8–5. Hendry made the highest break of the event, 99.


Main draw
Results are shown below.

References

Fosters Professional
1988 in snooker
1988 in Irish sport
Fosters